Daniel Wagner Jørgensen (born 3 June 1993), who also competes as Daniel Wagner or Daniel Jørgensen, is a leg amputee Danish Paralympic sportsman who has competed in both track and field athletics and snowboarding. As an athlete he specialises in the long jump, but also competes in sprint events.

Personal career
Jørgensen was born in Vejle, Denmark in 1993. As a youth he was a keen sportsman and took up both snowboarding and gymnastics. In 2008, whilst attempting a double front flip on a trampoline at a gymnastic show he landed badly and dislocated his knee. In the resulting surgery, doctors were sadly forced to amputate his leg.

Athletics career
As sprinting was part of his old gymnastics training, Jørgensen found he had a talent for running as a disability athlete, taking up disability athletics in 2010. Classified as a T42 athlete, Jørgensen first represented Denmark at an international level when he was chosen for the national team at the 2011 IPC Athletics World Championships in Christchurch, New Zealand. In Christchurch he took part in the 100m and 200m sprints but failed to make a podium finish in either events. The following year he was part of the Denmark team that travelled to London to take part in the 2012 Summer Paralympics. There he entered three events, the 100m and 200m sprint, and the long jump, in which he finished third, to claim his first international medal.

In 2013 Jørgensen attended his second World Championship, held in Lyon, where as well as the sprints, he entered the long jump, finishing just outside the medals in fourth place. The following year he attended the 2014 IPC Athletics European Championships in Swansea where he took three medals, a bronze in the 200m and two silvers in the 100m and long jump. Jørgensen showed continual improvement in the buildup to the Rio Paralympics, by winning medals in all three of his events at the 2015 World Championships in Doha. The following year, Jørgensen took gold in the long jump at the 2016 European Championships with a distance of 6.70 metres. This led to a season of tournaments which saw Jørgensen and German rival Heinrich Popow exchange the World record distance on several occasions.

Snowboarding career
Jørgensen began snowboarding while a child and continued to enjoy the sport after his accident. Classified as an SB-LL boarder, he represented Denmark at the 2015 Snowboarding World Championships in La Molina. He entered two events, the snowboard cross and the banked slalom, winning a bronze medal in the latter.

Wagner participates as the only Dane at the snowboarding events at the 2018 Winter Paralympics in Pyeongchang, South Korea. He was also the flagbearer for Denmark at the 2018 Winter Paralympics in the opening ceremony.

References

External links 

 
 Daniel Wagner at World Para Snowboard

1993 births
Living people
Danish male sprinters
Danish male long jumpers
Danish male snowboarders
Paralympic athletes of Denmark
Paralympic snowboarders of Denmark
Paralympic medalists in athletics (track and field)
Paralympic silver medalists for Denmark
Paralympic bronze medalists for Denmark
Athletes (track and field) at the 2012 Summer Paralympics
Athletes (track and field) at the 2016 Summer Paralympics
Athletes (track and field) at the 2020 Summer Paralympics
Snowboarders at the 2018 Winter Paralympics
Medalists at the 2012 Summer Paralympics
Medalists at the 2016 Summer Paralympics
People from Vejle Municipality
Medalists at the World Para Athletics Championships
Medalists at the World Para Athletics European Championships
Sportspeople from the Region of Southern Denmark
Sprinters with limb difference
Long jumpers with limb difference
Paralympic sprinters
Paralympic long jumpers